The 1946–47 Pittsburgh Ironmen season was the only season of the Pittsburgh Ironmen of the Basketball Association of America. They finished with a record of 15-45.

Roster

Regular season

Season standings

Record vs. opponents

Game log

Transactions

Trades

References

Pittsburgh Ironmen seasons
Pittsburgh